Linnaea floribunda, also known as Mexican abelia, is a species of flowering plant in the honeysuckle family, Caprifoliaceae, native to Mexico.

The flowers bloom year-round (in the wild) except in the spring. It fruits (produces a seed pod) year-round (in the wild) except May and June.

Under its other name Vesalea floribunda, it has gained the Royal Horticultural Society’s Award of Garden Merit. 

It the wild in Mexico, its natural habitat is mixed Pine and oak forests and on rocky outcrops.

References

Caprifoliaceae
Taxa named by Joseph Decaisne
Taxa named by Alexander Braun
Taxa named by Georg Carl Wilhelm Vatke
Flora of Mexico